Daniel Vezis is a two-handed bowler from Latvia. He has won many regional titles and multiple "6 no 36" weekly tournaments. Has represented  Latvia in European and International tournaments. And currently is playing on European Bowling Tour 2012 representing England.

Latvian tournament wins

Championship and cup medals

International tournaments

References

External links
Latvian Bowling Federation
Bowlero center

Latvian bowling players
Ten-pin bowling in Latvia
Ten-pin bowling players
Living people
Year of birth missing (living people)